Tulaya staudingeri is a moth in the family Crambidae. It was described by George Thomas Bethune-Baker in 1893. It is found in Iran.

The length of the forewings is about 13 mm. The forewings are pale brownish ochreous, with two dark umber-brown interrupted stripes. There is a dark umber spot in the centre of the cell. The hindwings are dark greyish brown.

References

Moths described in 1893
Odontiinae